Lamination is a manufacturing process.

Lamination may also refer to:

Mathematics

Lamination (topology), a partition of a closed subset of the surface into smooth curves.

Geology

Lamination (geology), a small-scale sequence of fine layers (laminae; singular: lamina) that occurs in sedimentary rocks

Food

Lamination (food), a method of preparing dough by separating layers of it with butter.